Sourou may refer to:

Sourou Province, Burkina Faso
Sourou River, Burkina Faso
Sourou, Benin